Sergey Sergeyevich Trofimov (born 27 July 1995) is a Russian speed skater. He competed in the 2018 Winter Olympics.

World Cup results

Podiums

Overall rankings

References

External links

1995 births
Living people
Speed skaters at the 2018 Winter Olympics
Speed skaters at the 2022 Winter Olympics
Medalists at the 2022 Winter Olympics
Olympic silver medalists for the Russian Olympic Committee athletes
Olympic medalists in short track speed skating
Russian male speed skaters
Olympic speed skaters of Russia
World Single Distances Speed Skating Championships medalists
Sportspeople from Nizhny Novgorod